Jon Kelley (born August 5, 1965) is an American sports journalist, author, producer, and television personality. Born and raised in Lincoln, Nebraska, Kelley played four seasons as a running back for the University of Nebraska before graduating with a Bachelor of Arts degree in broadcast journalism. He signed as a free agent with the Denver Broncos in 1988 before embarking on a broadcasting career.

He served as the host of the fifth season of ABC's reality television show The Mole.

Television work

Chicago sports anchor
During his eight years in Chicago, Kelley was widely regarded as one of the region's top sports anchors and directors, covering the World Championship Chicago Bulls in all six of the team's title seasons. In addition to his nightly sportscasts, Kelley hosted the number one rated "Sports Sunday," WMAQ-TV's half-hour, expanded sports highlights program. There he shared the anchor desk with some of the city's most dynamic sports and entertainment personalities, including NBA star Dennis Rodman and "Tonight Show" host Jay Leno among others. Kelley joined WMAQ-TV as a sports reporter and weekend anchor in April 1991.

WMAQ-TV
While at WMAQ-TV, Kelley was part of a sports team that earned such prestigious awards as the Chicago/Midwest Emmy award for producing and anchoring his hour-long special highlighting the Chicago Bulls' quest for a fifth championship. Kelley also received the Peter Lisagor Award for Sports Journalism and an Illinois Broadcasters Association Silver Dome Award for Best Sportscast.

Early broadcast career 
During his early years in broadcasting, Kelley did stints as a sports reporter and weekend sports anchor at WDAF-TV, Channel 4, the Fox affiliate in Kansas City, Missouri, and worked as a news reporter at KMTV-TV in Omaha, Nebraska. He began his career as a weekend sports anchor and reporter at KTIV-TV in Sioux City, Iowa.

Fox Sports Network
Kelley served as the main anchor for the Fox Sports Network's "The National Sports Report," and the lead anchor for the weekly series "Baseball Today."

Extra
Kelley co-hosted "Extra's" one-hour weekend edition and was the show's primary correspondent from 2001 through 2007.

ABC and The Mole
Kelley co-hosted ABC's "Holiday with the Stars" and ABC's "All-Star Tribute to Movies" on Oscar Sunday. His diverse broadcast career has spanned over 15 years in news, sports, and entertainment. He hosted the summer 2008 revival of the reality TV series The Mole, the show previously hosted by Anderson Cooper and Ahmad Rashad.

KNTV-TV
On July 8, 2011, it was announced that Kelley would join the NBC affiliate in San Francisco as co-anchor of the morning show.

WFLD
In November 2013, Kelley left San Francisco and returned to Chicago to join the FOX owned and operated station in Chicago to co-anchor Good Day Chicago.

Entertainment Studios
In June 2016, Kelley teamed up with media mogul Byron Allen, joining Allen's Entertainment Studios. Kelley assumes hosting and producing duties on several of Allen's television properties, including the revival of the late 1960s game show Funny You Should Ask, launching in syndication in the fall of 2017; the celebrity interview series Entertainers and the sports profile series The American Athlete. Additionally, Kelley takes on a role with Entertainment Studios Motion Pictures, working with Freestyle Releasing, acquired by Allen in 2015. Kelley also produces content for Entertainment Studios’ video news platform, TheGrio.com.

Writings
Kelley is the co-author of the book "Breaking Into Broadcasting," a guide to landing one's first (or next) on-air job in television.

References

External links
 "The Mole" Page on ABC.com (Official)

1965 births
American television reporters and correspondents
African-American players of American football
American football running backs
Denver Broncos players
American game show hosts
Living people
Writers from Lincoln, Nebraska
American sports announcers
Participants in American reality television series
African-American game show hosts
21st-century African-American people
20th-century African-American sportspeople